Football returned to relative normal in 1945 following the conclusion of World War II. Two rivals from the pre-war years met once again in the annual Grey Cup, but on this occasion, the Winnipeg Blue Bombers were no match for the Toronto Argonauts. For Winnipeg, it was the worst loss by a western team in the Grey Cup since 1923 when Queen's University routed the Regina Roughriders 54-0.

Canadian Football News in 1945
On Thursday, September 27 a new football team was formed in Calgary. On October 10, it was decided that the new team would play as the Calgary Stampeders. The Stampeders joined the WIFU with blue and gold colours.

The IRFU would resume play, but the WIFU still suspended operations.

Regular season

Final regular season standings
Note: GP = Games Played, W = Wins, L = Losses, T = Ties, PF = Points For, PA = Points Against, Pts = Points

Western Interprovincial Football Union
NO LEAGUE PLAY

Bold text means that they have clinched the playoffs.

Grey Cup playoffs
Note: All dates in 1945

Semifinals

Finals 

Toronto won the total-point series by 33–18. Toronto will play the Toronto Balmy Beach Beachers (ORFU Champions) in the Eastern finals.

Winnipeg advances to the Grey Cup game.

Toronto won the total-point series by 17–1. Toronto will play the Toronto Argonauts (IRFU Champions) in the Eastern finals.

Eastern Finals

Toronto advances to the Grey Cup game.

Playoff bracket

Grey Cup Championship

Note: WIFU semifinal playoff dates are not confirmed, nor is Eastern Final date. However, since the regular season in the East ended October 27, and all other playoff dates, as well as Grey Cup date are accurate, it is reasonable to assume the above dates are accurate.1945 Interprovincial Rugby Football Union All-StarsNOTE: During this time most players played both ways, so the All-Star selections do not distinguish between some offensive and defensive positions.QB – Billy Myers, Toronto Argonauts
HB – Royal Copeland, Toronto Argonauts
HB – Joe Krol, Toronto Argonauts
FB – Tony Golab, Ottawa Rough Riders
E  – Dick Groom, Hamilton Tigers
E  – Jack Wedley, Toronto Argonauts
FW – Ken Charlton, Ottawa Rough Riders
C  – Curly Moynahan, Ottawa Rough Riders
G  – George Fraser, Ottawa Rough Riders
G  – Eddie Remigis, Hamilton Tigers
T  – Eric Chipper, Ottawa Rough Riders
T  – Les Ascot, Toronto Argonauts
T  – Steve Levantis, Toronto Argonauts

1945 Ontario Rugby Football Union All-StarsNOTE: During this time most players played both ways, so the All-Star selections do not distinguish between some offensive and defensive positions.''
QB – Bill Stukus, Toronto Indians
HB – Doug Pyzer, Toronto Indians
HB – Ross McKelvey, Toronto Indians
DB – Sam Sward, Toronto Balmy Beach Beachers
E  – Len Wright, Hamilton Wildcats
E  – Johnny Farmer, Toronto Indians
FW – Fred Kijek, Toronto Indians
C  – Bob Cosgrove, Toronto Balmy Beach Beachers
G  – George Mountain, Hamilton Wildcats
G  – Len Staughton, Toronto Balmy Beach Beachers
G  – Harry "Suze" Turner, Toronto Balmy Beach Beachers
T  – George Sprague, Ottawa Trojans
T  – Don Durno, Toronto Indians

1945 Canadian Football Awards
 Jeff Russel Memorial Trophy (IRFU MVP) – George Fraser (OG), Ottawa Rough Riders
 Imperial Oil Trophy (ORFU MVP) - Arnie McWatters - Ottawa Trojans

References

 
Canadian Football League seasons
Grey Cups hosted in Toronto